Susan Joyce Vreeland (January 20, 1946 – August 23, 2017) was an American author. Several of her books deal with the relationship between art and fiction. The Passion of Artemisia is a fictionalised investigation of some aspects of the life of Artemisia Gentileschi, while The Girl in Hyacinth Blue centres round an imaginary painting by Vermeer. The Forest Lover is a fictionalized account of the life of the Canadian painter Emily Carr.

Early life
Vreeland was born in Racine, Wisconsin to William Alex Vreeland and Esther Alberta, née Jancovius. Her mother was from an artistic family and had studied at the Art Institute of Chicago. The family moved to California in 1948. Vreeland took a BA in English and library science at San Diego State University in 1969, an MA in education in 1972, and an MA in English in 1978.

Works 

The works of Susan Vreeland include:
 What Love Sees: a biographical novel. New York: PaperJacks, 1988. .
 What English Teachers Want: A Survival Guide. Unionville, NY: Royal Fireworks Press, 1995. .
 Girl in Hyacinth Blue. Denver: MacMurray & Beck, 1999. .
 The Passion of Artemisia. New York: Viking, 2002. .
 The Forest Lover. New York: Viking, 2004. .
 Life Studies. New York: Viking, 2005. .
 Luncheon of the Boating Party. New York: Viking, 2007. .
 Clara and Mr. Tiffany. New York: Random House, 2011. .
 Lisette's List. New York: Random House, 2014. .

References 

1946 births
2017 deaths
20th-century American novelists
20th-century American women writers
21st-century American novelists
21st-century American women writers
American fiction writers
American women novelists
San Diego State University alumni
Writers from Racine, Wisconsin
Writers from San Diego
Novelists from Wisconsin